Roméo is an integrated tool environment for modeling, validation and verification of real-time systems modeled as time Petri Nets  or stopwatch Petri Nets, extended with parameters.

The tool has been developed by the Real-Time Systems group at LS2N lab (École centrale de Nantes, University of Nantes, CNRS) in Nantes, France.

References

External links 
 Web page of Roméo
  Web page of LS2N lab

Model checkers